Retox is the seventh album by Norwegian rock band Turbonegro. It is the first release under the band's newly created Scandinavian Leather Recordings. The album was released on 11 June 2007 in Norway, 13 June 2007 in Sweden and on 15 June 2007 in the rest of Europe (excluding the UK). It was released on 23 June 2007 in Australia, 9 July 2007 in the UK and 14 August 2007 in the US.

According to Turbonegro, Retox is "a nihilistic homo punk metal bikermovie: Full of speed, power, humiliation and freedom!". "Retox is rock music that's been up for 5 days without sleeping, able to see more than most people, but not seeing anything exactly clear." They have also added: "We survived Grunge, Britpop, House music, Hip Hop, new rock revolution, dance rock, but maybe not new rave..? People say we've been making the same record for 10 years, that's not right. We've been making the same record for 4-5 years."

The club Sticky Fingers in Gothenburg, Sweden held a Retox release party on 15 June, which also coincided with Hank's 35th birthday. The band was in attendance, equipped with several giveaways and playing some songs.

It is the final Turbonegro album to feature vocalist Hank von Helvete, rhythm guitarist Pål Pot Pamparius and drummer Chris Summers.

Recording process
After recording a demo in May 2006 at Knut's Crystal Canyon Studio, the band recorded the basic tracks at Fagerborg Lydstudio and returned to Crystal Canyon again to finish the recordings together with Anders Møller (of Gluecifer and Euroboys among others). In January 2007, Knut, Tom and Chris travelled to the US to mix the album together with John Agnello (who previously worked a lot with Dinosaur Jr.) at Water Music in Hoboken, New Jersey. The band selected 11 of the 23 songs and sent them for mastering to Ted Jensen (who has also worked on Green Day's American Idiot album) at Sterling Sound in New York City.

Track listing
 "We're Gonna Drop the Atom Bomb" – 3:41
 "Welcome to the Garbage Dump" – 1:58
 "Hell Toupée" – 3:27
 "Stroke the Shaft" – 3:19
 "No, I'm Alpha Male" – 3:13
 "Do You Do You Dig Destruction" – 3:46
 "I Wanna Come" – 3:37
 "You Must Bleed/All Night Long" – 2:39
 "Hot and Filthy" – 3:15
 "Boys from Nowhere" – 3:29
 "Everybody Loves a Chubby Dude" – 3:48
 "What is Rock?!" – 7:49
 "Back In Denim" – 4:10 (Lawrence; originally performed by Denim) (special edition digipak bonus track)
 "Into the Void" – 3:05 (special edition digipak bonus track)
 "Levelled Karma" (Australian iTunes bonus track)

Personnel
Hank von Helvete (Hans Erik Dyvik Husby) – vocals
Euroboy (Knut Schreiner) – lead guitar
Rune Rebellion (Rune Grønn) – rhythm guitar
Pål Pot Pamparius (Pål Bottger Kjærnes) – rhythm guitar
Happy-Tom (Thomas Seltzer) – bass
Chris Summers (Christer Engen) – drums
John Agnello – mixing
Ted Jensen – mastering

References

External links
 Turbojugend USA

2007 albums
Turbonegro albums
Cooking Vinyl albums